Winestead is a village in the East Riding of Yorkshire, England, in an area known as Holderness. It is situated to the north of the A1033 road. It forms part of the civil parish of Patrington.

It is also the ancient seat of the Hildyard/Hilliard/Hildegardis family, whose ancestry is believed to be of Saxon origin. The Hildyard family of Winestead became extinct on the death of Sir Robert D'Arcy Hildyard, Bart., who died without heirs in 1814. Hildyard bequeathed his estates to his niece, Ann Catherine Whyte, who married in the following year Thomas Blackborne Thoroton, Esq., of Flintham Hall, Flintham, Nottingham. Col. Thoroton of the Coldstream Guards subsequently assumed the name and coat-of-arms of Hildyard. His heirs, who still have the surname Hildyard, reside at Flintham Hall today. The Hildyard family lived at Winestead for 10 generations, and even after the death of the last Baronet, the heirs continued to own Winestead Hall.

In 1823 inhabitants in the village numbered 129. Occupations included six farmers.

The church of St Germain was designated a Grade I listed building in 1966 and is now recorded in the National Heritage List for England, maintained by Historic England.

The White Hall was designated a Grade II* listed building in 1966 and is now recorded in the National Heritage List for England, maintained by Historic England.

Winestead was served from 1854 to 1964 by Winestead railway station on the Hull and Holderness Railway.

Notable people
 Andrew Marvell (1621–1678), metaphysical poet, MP and diplomat, was born in the village.

Henry Maister (1813–1898), cricketer

References

External links

Villages in the East Riding of Yorkshire
Holderness